is a 1995 sports game developed by Nintendo for the Virtual Boy video game console. The game was released at the launch of the Virtual Boy, and later as a pack-in game in North America.

Gameplay
 
Mario's Tennis is a sports game in which the player controls one of seven different Mario characters and engages in tennis matches. The action on the court is viewed from directly behind the player character from a third person perspective. The Virtual Boy's stereoscopic 3D graphics allow the player to perceive depth within the tennis court, allowing for better perception in the distance between a tennis ball and the respective character. Unlike later entries in the Mario Tennis series, which added gameplay elements not present in tradition tennis, such as "power up items", special "power shots", or external obstacles interfering with the game, Mario's Tennis simply focuses on tennis fundamentals.

Mario's Tennis supports a number of different game modes and customization options. The player may choose one of seven Mario characters, including Mario, Luigi, Princess Toadstool, Yoshi, Toad, and Donkey Kong Jr., all with differing attributes in regards to "speed", "power" or "racket area". Either a single game, or a three-game tournament mode may be chosen, both having the option to play either singles or doubles matches on easy, normal, or hard difficulties. Although a two-player function was announced, it was not implemented since the cable required to link two Virtual Boy units was never released.

Development
The game initially had a working title of  Mario's Dream Tennis upon its announcement. The game was developed by Nintendo R&D1, with director Gunpei Yokoi, the same team that was responsible for the development of the Virtual Boy itself. His success with the Game Boy line of systems, coupled with the public's general belief that it was too early for the next generation of systems, due to the failure of systems such as the 3DO and the Atari Jaguar, lead the team to brainstorm on different approaches that could be taken. The team came up with a system that used stereoscopic 3D images to display conventional 2D graphics, the Virtual Boy being the result of the hardware end, and Mario's Tennis and Mario Clash the end results of the software end. It was one of the four launch games that were released alongside the console and the console's pack-in game in North America. Like all other Virtual Boy games, Mario's Tennis uses a red-and-black color scheme and uses parallax, an optical trick that is used to simulate a 3D effect.

Reception
The game received generally mixed reviews from critics. A common complaint cited by reviewers was the fact that it was a tennis/sports game that lacked a multiplayer mode. Famicom Tsūshin scored the game a 26 out of 40. Next Generation awarded the game three out of five stars. A writer for the magazine commented, "[I]f you're looking for an addictive title to play on your Virtual Boy, this is one of the best choices you can make." GamePro remarked that "Mario's Tennis commits a fault only with its simplistic music and effects", applauding the impressive 3D visuals, exceptionally large variety of moves for a tennis game, and challenging opponents. They later awarded it Best Virtual Boy Game of 1995.

In a retrospective review 1UP.com praised the game's 3D effects, but criticized the game's lack of a multiplayer mode, or much to actually accomplish in the single player mode. Nintendo Life gave the game a 7 out of 10 stars, calling it a "solid, if simple, tennis game" that possessed "Good music and graphics combined with...excellent 3D effect", though they too felt the game was held back by a lack of multiplayer mode, and a lack of characters, which led to the tournaments being too short.  IGN's Patrick Kolan compared the game to Wii Sports, another one of Nintendo's pack-in games for one of its consoles, the Wii, in that it showed off the system's unique strengths, but suffered in regards to non-impressive graphics and a lack of long-term game content. GamesRadar echoed these sentiments, stating "Gameplay was rudimentary, and lacked all the flash and silliness that came to define the Mario Sports series, but as a 3D showpiece it worked fairly well". The Rome News-Tribune referred to Mario's Tennis as "the only...decent stab at tennis" prior to the release of Sega's 2000 Dreamcast game Virtua Tennis.

Legacy
Mario's Tennis not only started the Mario Tennis series of video games, but has also been credited as being the game that started up the sports-related sub-series of Mario video games in general as well.

See also
List of Virtual Boy games
Mario Clash – another Mario game for the Virtual Boy by the same development team

Notes

References

External links
Official Nintendo Japan Mario's Tennis site
 

1995 video games
Mario Tennis
Nintendo Research & Development 1 games
Pack-in video games
Tennis video games
Video games developed in Japan
Virtual Boy games
Single-player video games